Taereung International Skating Rink is a speed skating oval in South Korea, used for training and competitions, operated by the Korean Olympic Committee. It is one of only two indoor long-track (400m) skating facilities in the country, and the most actively used, with Gangneung Oval completed in 2017 for the 2018 Winter Olympics but planned for conversion to a multi-sports and convention center. It is also one of the remaining active training grounds of the Korea National Training Center in Gongneung-dong, Nowon-gu in northeast Seoul; most other teams, including the short track and ice hockey teams, have moved to Jincheon National Training Center

The facility offers instructional courses in speed skating and figure skating, along with open skate hours for the general public

International events hosted 

 1989-90 ISU Speed Skating World Cup - weekend 4
 1992-93 ISU Speed Skating World Cup - weekend 3
 2000-01 ISU Speed Skating World Cup - weekend 3
 2000 World Sprint Speed Skating Championships
 2004 World Single Distance Speed Skating Championships
 2014–15 ISU Speed Skating World Cup - weekend 2
 2016 World Sprint Speed Skating Championships

References

External links 

 Track records

Ice skating in South Korea
Sports venues in South Korea
Speed skating
Speed skating venues
South Korea at the Olympics